In geometry, Hermann–Mauguin notation is used to represent the symmetry elements in point groups, plane groups and space groups. It is named after the German crystallographer Carl Hermann (who introduced it in 1928) and the French mineralogist Charles-Victor Mauguin (who modified it in 1931). This notation is sometimes called international notation, because it was adopted as standard by the International Tables For Crystallography since their first edition in 1935.

The Hermann–Mauguin notation, compared with the Schoenflies notation, is preferred in crystallography because it can easily be used to include translational symmetry elements, and it specifies the directions of the symmetry axes.

Point groups
Rotation axes are denoted by a number n — 1, 2, 3, 4, 5, 6, 7, 8 ... (angle of rotation φ = ). For improper rotations, Hermann–Mauguin symbols show rotoinversion axes, unlike Schoenflies and Shubnikov notations, that shows rotation-reflection axes. The direction of the mirror plane is defined as the direction of the perpendicular to it (the direction of the  axis).

Hermann–Mauguin symbols show non-equivalent axes and planes in a symmetrical fashion. The direction of a symmetry element corresponds to its position in the Hermann–Mauguin symbol. If a rotation axis n and a mirror plane m have the same direction (i.e. the plane is perpendicular to axis n), then they are denoted as a fraction  or n/m.

If two or more axes have the same direction, the axis with higher symmetry is shown. Higher symmetry means that the axis generates a pattern with more points. For example, rotation axes 3, 4, 5, 6, 7, 8 generate 3-, 4-, 5-, 6-, 7-, 8-point patterns, respectively. If a rotation and a rotoinversion axis generate the same number of points, the rotation axis should be chosen. Analogously, in the case when both 3 and  axes are present,  should be written. However we write , not , because both 4 and  generate four points.

Finally, the Hermann–Mauguin symbol depends on the type of the group.

Groups without higher-order axes (axes of order three or more) 
These groups may contain only two-fold axes, mirror planes, and/or an inversion center. If the symbol contains three positions, then they denote symmetry elements in the x, y, z direction, respectively.

Groups with one higher-order axis 
 First position — primary direction — z direction, assigned to the higher-order axis. 
 Second position — symmetrically equivalent secondary directions, which are perpendicular to the z-axis.
 Third position — symmetrically equivalent tertiary directions, passing between secondary directions.
Analogously, symbols of non-crystallographic groups (with axes of order 5, 7, 8, 9 ...) can be constructed. These groups can be arranged in the following table

It can be noticed that in groups with odd-order axes n and  the third position in symbol is always absent, because all n directions, perpendicular to higher-order axis, are symmetrically equivalent. For example, in the picture of a triangle all three mirror planes (S0, S1, S2) are equivalent — all of them pass through one vertex and the center of the opposite side. 
For even-order axes n and  there are  secondary directions and  tertiary directions. For example, in the picture of a regular hexagon one can distinguish two sets of mirror planes — three planes go through two opposite vertexes, and three other planes go through the centers of opposite sides. In this case any of two sets can be chosen as secondary directions, the rest set will be tertiary directions. Hence groups 2m, 2m, 2m, ... can be written as m2, m2, m2, ... . For symbols of point groups this order usually doesn't matter; however, it will be important for Hermann–Mauguin symbols of corresponding space groups, where secondary directions are directions of symmetry elements along unit cell translations b and c, while the tertiary directions correspond to the direction between unit cell translations b and c. For example, symbols Pm2 and P2m denote two different space groups. The perpendicular symmetry elements can go along unit cell translations b and c or between them. Space groups P321 and P312 are examples of the former and the latter cases, respectively.

The symbol of point group  may be confusing; the corresponding Schoenflies symbol is D3d, which means that the group consists of 3-fold axis, three perpendicular 2-fold axes, and 3 vertical diagonal planes passing between these 2-fold axes, so it seems that the group can be denoted as 32m or 3m2. Second, these  complexes generate an inversion center, which combining with the 3-fold rotation axis generates a  rotoinversion axis.

Groups with n = ∞ are called limit groups or Curie groups.

Groups with several higher-order axes 
All of them contain four diagonal 3-fold axes. These axes are arranged as 3-fold axes in a cube, directed along its four space diagonals (the cube has  symmetry). These symbols are constructed the following way:
 First position — symmetrically equivalent directions of the coordinate axes x, y, and z. They are equivalent due to the presence of diagonal 3-fold axes.
 Second position  — diagonal 3 or  axes.
 Third position — diagonal directions between any two of the three coordinate axes x, y, and z.

All Hermann–Mauguin symbols presented above are called full symbols. For many groups they can be simplified by omitting n-fold rotation axes in  positions. This can be done if the rotation axis can be unambiguously obtained from the combination of symmetry elements presented in the symbol. In groups containing one higher-order axis, this higher-order axis cannot be omitted. The full and short symbols for all 32 crystallographic point groups are given in crystallographic point groups page.

Besides five cubic groups, there are two more non-crystallographic icosahedral groups (I and Ih in Schoenflies notation) and two limit groups (K and Kh in Schoenflies notation). The Hermann–Mauguin symbols were not designed for non-crystallographic groups, so their symbols are rather nominal and based on similarity to symbols of the crystallographic groups of a cubic crystal system. Group I can be denoted as 235, 25, 532, 53. The possible short symbols for Ih are m, m, mm, m. The possible symbols for limit group K are ∞∞ or 2∞, and for Kh are ∞ or m or ∞∞m.

Plane groups
Plane groups can be depicted using the Hermann–Mauguin system. The first letter is either lowercase p or c to represent primitive or centered unit cells. The next number is the rotational symmetry, as given above. The presence of mirror planes are denoted m, while glide reflections are only denoted g. Screw axes do not exist in two dimension, they required 3D space.

Space groups

The symbol of a space group is defined by combining the uppercase letter describing the lattice type with symbols specifying the symmetry elements. The symmetry elements are ordered the same way as in the symbol of corresponding point group (group that is obtained if one removes all translational components from the space group). The symbols for symmetry elements are more diverse, because in addition to rotations axes and mirror planes, space group may contain more complex symmetry elements—screw axes (combination of rotation and translation) and glide planes (combination of mirror reflection and translation). As a result, many different space groups can correspond to the same point group. For example, choosing different lattice types and glide planes one can generate 28 different space groups from point group mmm, e.g. Pmmm, Pnnn, Pccm, Pban, Cmcm, Ibam, Fmmm, Fddd.

Lattice types
These are the Bravais lattice types in three dimensions:

P — Primitive
I — Body centered (from the German "Innenzentriert")
F — Face centered (from the German "Flächenzentriert")
A — Base centered on A faces only
B — Base centered on B faces only
C — Base centered on C faces only
R — Rhombohedral

Screw axes
The degree of translation is then added as a subscript showing how far along the axis the translation is, as a portion of the parallel lattice vector.

The possible screw axes are: 21, 31, 32, 41, 42, 43, 61, 62, 63, 64, and 65.
There are 4 enantiomorphic pairs of axes: (31 — 32), (41 — 43), (61 — 65), and (62 — 64). This enantiomorphism results in 11 pairs of enantiomorphic space groups, namely

Glide planes
Glide planes are noted by a, b, or c depending on which axis the glide is along. There is also the n glide, which is a glide along the half of a diagonal of a face, and the d glide, which is along a quarter of either a face or space diagonal of the unit cell. The d glide is often called the diamond glide plane as it features in the diamond structure.

a, b, or c glide translation along half the lattice vector of this face.
n glide translation along half a face diagonal.
d glide planes with translation along a quarter of a face diagonal or of a space diagonal.
e two glides with the same glide plane and translation along two (different) half-lattice vectors.

References

External links 
 Decoding the Hermann-Maguin Notation - An introduction into the Hermann-Maguin notation for beginners.

Crystallography
Chemical nomenclature